Bernardo Baloyes Navas (born 6 January 1994) is a Colombian athlete sprinter specialising in the 200 metres. He represented his country at the 2013 World Championships in Athletics without advancing from the first round.

He represented Colombia at the 2020 Summer Olympics.

International competitions

Personal bests
Outdoor
100 metres – 10.18 (+1.2 m/s, Barranquilla 2019)
200 metres – 20.00 NR (+0.3 m/s, Barranquilla 2018)
400 metres – 45.68 (Medellín 2014)

References

1994 births
Living people
Colombian male sprinters
Athletes (track and field) at the 2015 Pan American Games
Athletes (track and field) at the 2019 Pan American Games
Pan American Games competitors for Colombia
People from Córdoba Department
Athletes (track and field) at the 2016 Summer Olympics
Olympic athletes of Colombia
World Athletics Championships athletes for Colombia
Athletes (track and field) at the 2018 South American Games
Competitors at the 2018 Central American and Caribbean Games
Central American and Caribbean Games gold medalists for Colombia
South American Games gold medalists for Colombia
South American Games bronze medalists for Colombia
South American Games medalists in athletics
South American Championships in Athletics winners
Central American and Caribbean Games medalists in athletics
South American Games gold medalists in athletics
20th-century Colombian people
21st-century Colombian people